Strobe is a fictional mutant character appearing in American comic books published by Marvel Comics. She was created for the villainous team the Mutant Liberation Front (MLF).

Publication history
Strobe made her first appearance in New Mutants #86. However, in this issue she appears in only one panel, with her face obscured, and is not identified, though one of her teammates, Tempo, is incorrectly addressed as "Strobe". Her first full appearance is in New Mutants #87.

Fictional character biography
The Mutant Liberation Front (MLF), including Strobe, first came on the scene to demand the liberation of two incarcerated mutants, Skids and Rusty Collins. They destroy an energy plant as proof of their convictions. The group tries to free them by force, but this only ends in confusion. During the break-in, Cable tries to intervene and a prison guard accidentally shoots Rusty. Skids believes that it was Cable who shot her friend, so she decides to side with the MLF.

The New Mutants track the team down to Madripoor and get in a few conflicts with them. Even with the help of Sunfire, the MLF manages to capture several of the New Mutants. However, their victory is short-lived with the arrival of Wolverine who helps the teens liberate their kidnapped friends. But before the MLF can be caught, they teleport to safety.

Strobe next appears with an MLF strike force who attempt to break Nasty Boys members Slab and Hairbag out of prison. They succeed and then set their eyes on destroying the Tucker clinic, however they are thwarted by X-Factor who had been tipped off by MLF member Tempo. With their leader almost being captured, the MLF once more escapes to freedom.

As the events of the X-Cutioner's Song begin to unfold, the MLF finds itself collecting an array of ancient relics. The team, including Strobe, split into strike forces to steal the various artifacts that will help Apocalypse from his slumber. Later on, in X-Factor #85, the New Mutants, X-Factor and the X-Men discover the latest MLF base in Dust Bowl, Arkansas. After an intense battle, all member of the MLF are captured and taken into custody, though Strobe severely damages Rogue's eyesight, resulting in a long recovery.

In the wake of M-Day—an event in which a mentally ill Scarlet Witch depowered over 90% of the mutant population—Strobe was shown to be one of the many who lost her powers (revealed in New Avengers #18).

Powers and abilities
Strobe formerly had the ability to project heat and light blasts capable of blinding, scorching, or melting opponents and objects, and create energy shields.

In other media

Television
 Strobe appears in the X-Men episode "Secrets Not Long Buried". She is one of the many residents of the mutant-dominated community of Skull Mesa.

References

External links
 Uncannyxmen.net character bio on Strobe
 Uncannyxmen.net feature on the MLF

Comics characters introduced in 1990
Fictional characters with fire or heat abilities
Marvel Comics female supervillains
Marvel Comics mutants